Lorin Cave Selby (born 1963) is a United States Navy rear admiral who has served as the Chief of Naval Research since May 31, 2020. Previously, he served as the Chief Engineer of the United States Navy and Deputy Commander for Ship Design, Integration, and Naval Engineering of the Naval Sea Systems Command from June 2016 until May 2020.

Born and raised in Baltimore, Maryland, Selby graduated from the University of Virginia in December 1986 with a Bachelor of Science degree in nuclear engineering. He later earned an Master of Science degree in nuclear engineering and a Nuclear Engineer degree from the Massachusetts Institute of Technology. His June 1993 thesis was entitled Experimental Evaluation of an Instrumented Synthesis Method for the Real-Time Estimation of Reactivity.

References

External links

Date of birth missing (living people)
1963 births
Living people
People from Baltimore
University of Virginia School of Engineering and Applied Science alumni
MIT School of Engineering alumni
United States submarine commanders
Recipients of the Meritorious Service Medal (United States)
Recipients of the Legion of Merit
United States Navy admirals
Recipients of the Navy Distinguished Service Medal